Stuart River Provincial Park is a provincial park in British Columbia, Canada. It is located in two sections north and northwest of Vanderhoof along the Stuart River southeast of Stuart Lake and the city of Fort St. James. The upper site, which is located around the confluence of the Stuart and Nechako Rivers, includes the site of Chinlac, a Dakelh village whose inhabitants were massacred and enslaved by the Tsilhqot'in of Anahim Lake c. 1745.

See also
Nechako Canyon Protected Area

References

External links
BC Parks infopage

Provincial parks of British Columbia
Omineca Country
Dakelh
Protected areas established in 1999
1999 establishments in British Columbia